The Tacarigua River (commonly known as the Caura River) is a river on the island of Trinidad.  It originates in the Northern Range and drains into the Caura Valley.  It passes through the town of Tacarigua in the East–West Corridor before joining the Caroni River.  The Caura River is important both recreationally and culturally.

Contamination
Currently the Caura River is at risk to pollution from fertilizers and pesticides used by the farmers within the valley and solid waste from visitors who visit for leisure.

It was once an Arawak settlement. It was also in a sea of controversy as it was a proposed site for the building of a dam in 1943. And though it was started, it was never completed to this day, and equipment for the construction of this proposed dam still lies there to date. The money was embezzled and still cannot be accounted for. After this fiasco, there were successful attempts to turn Caura into a park for aesthetic purposes and this has proved well done.
However, due to the recent spate of crime which has risen to plague the country, it has become a favorite hot spot for crime, with visitors reporting items stolen from their cars, as well as armed robberies.

See also 
 List of rivers in Trinidad and Tobago

Rivers of Trinidad and Tobago